No Cities to Love is the eighth studio album by American rock band Sleater-Kinney, released on January 20, 2015, through Sub Pop. It is the first album following a decade-long hiatus and the band's 2005 release, The Woods. The album received universal acclaim from music critics and was listed on several "Best Albums of 2015" lists.

Recording and release
The album was recorded in secret mostly at Tiny Telephone in San Francisco, with additional sessions at Electrokitty in Seattle and Kung Fu Bakery in Portland. It was produced by John Goodmanson. 

On December 22, 2014, No Cities to Love was accidentally streamed three weeks early by the band's label, Sub Pop. As of January 30, 2015, the album has sold 28,000 copies in the U.S. according to Nielsen SoundScan.

The video for the title track features celebrities singing the song, including Andy Samberg, Vanessa Bayer, Fred Armisen, Sarah Silverman, Norman Reedus, Miranda July, Brie Larson, Natasha Lyonne, Elliot Page, Dinosaur Jr.'s J Mascis, and My Chemical Romance's Gerard Way.

Tour
In support of the album, the band toured North America and Europe. Chicago Tribune critic Greg Kot listed the supporting tour as one of the winter's top rock shows.

Critical reception

No Cities to Love was met with widespread critical acclaim. At Metacritic, which assigns a normalized rating out of 100 to reviews from mainstream publications, it received an average score of 90, based on 39 reviews. Los Angeles Times critic Randall Roberts said "the work commands attention", while Jon Pareles from The New York Times said it was "the first great album of 2015", full of "hurtling, bristling, densely packed, white-knuckled songs that are all taut construction and raw nerve". Robert Christgau gave the record an "A" and felt it may be Sleater-Kinney's best record, while writing in Cuepoint: "Honed back down to punky three-minute songs because the leisure to stretch out is a luxury they can’t presently afford, the music carries the seed of tumult to come, the sense that something or everything could explode without notice just the way this album did." In The Observer, Kitty Empire said the band had executed "pretty much the most perfect comeback of recent years" and sounded "exactly as taut and emotive as they used to." Writing with high praise for Exclaim!, Chris Bilton called the record "a thoroughly raging collection of post-punk anthems that nudges up the powerful perfection of 2005's The Woods at least another notch." Music journalist Graham Reid said it had "all the stabbing energy of Gang of Four, the blazing passion of Siouxsie Sioux and the drama of Hole at their (rare) best". In an interview for Rolling Stone, musician St. Vincent said it was her favorite Sleater-Kinney record so far and "a crowning jewel in their legacy".

Accolades

Track listing

Personnel
Credits adapted from AllMusic

Sleater-Kinney
 Corin Tucker — guitar, vocals
 Carrie Brownstein — guitar, vocals
 Janet Weiss — drums

Technical personnel
 Greg Calbi — mastering
 John Goodmanson — engineer, mixing, production
 Thea Lorentzen — cover photo, design
 Mike Mills — art direction, cover photo, design
 Jay Pellicci — engineer
 Garrett G. Reynolds — engineer
 Brigitte Sire — band photo

Charts

Weekly charts

Year-end charts

References

Notes

Sources

Further reading

External links
Sleater-Kinney "ask us anything" about No Cities To Love at reddit.com, December 2, 2014

2015 albums
Albums produced by John Goodmanson
Sleater-Kinney albums
Sub Pop albums